Nilsiä is a former small town and a municipality of Finland. It joined the city of Kuopio at the beginning of year 2013.

It is located in the Northern Savonia region.

The municipality is unilingually Finnish.

The last few decades have been a period of rapid progress for the town, especially its tourism. There are still plenty of traditional rural occupations, but also many kinds of commercial activities. Nilsiä has become the administrative and commercial centre of Northeast Savonia and it co-operates actively with the city of Kuopio. The services in Nilsiä are as diverse as in many larger towns.

Nilsiä has exceptionally much to offer to those who love sports and nature, whether it is winter or summer. Tahkovuori is a popular winter sport centre. There are also marked routes for snowmobile trainers.

In summer there are many marked paths for hiking and mountain biking. There is a marina and good fishing possibilities in lakes Syväri and Vuotjärvi, like in the Lastukoski rapids, too.

Nilsiä is also a well-known golf centre.

People born in Nilsiä
Olli Zitting (1872 – 1929)
Aatu Halme (1873 – 1933)
Aaro Salo (1874 – 1949)
Anni Savolainen-Tapaninen (1875 – 1952)
Emil Rautaharju (1875 – 1947)
Ville Korhonen (1877 – 1931)
Pekka Heikkinen (1883 – 1959)
Taavetti Lukkarinen (1884 – 1916)
Antti Tossavainen (1886 – 1962)
Heikki Taskinen (1888 – 1952)
Ville Kyrönen (1891 – 1959)
Pauli Pitkänen (1911 – 1941)
Osmo Vepsäläinen (1931 – )
Raimo Tuomainen (1957 – )

References

External links

Municipality of Nilsiä – Official website

Populated places established in 1869
Nilsiä
Former municipalities of Finland
1869 establishments in the Russian Empire